Kim Kuzma is a Canadian musician. She released her debut album Contradictions in 1999.

Career
Kuzma collaborated with other artists on the studio album, Who You Are released in Fall 2005. The album comprised remixed pop songs and original dance music, featuring a remix of "Calling you" by Bagdad Café, "God only knows" by the Beach Boys and originals "I’d Miss You", "Come Along", and "Price You Pay". It was recorded at Aureus Studios in San Francisco, by composer and producer, Steven Marc Trier.

Kuzma has performed solo shows at the Plush Room and Martuni’s, opened for Harry Belafonte in the Wine Country, and performed at the Palace of Fine Arts and the Castro Theatre with the San Francisco Gay Men's Chorus. Kuzma has also performed live in the pride parade in San Francisco and Vancouver. She has performed for five years as a headliner of the TD Canada Trust Music Davie Day Community Concert in Vancouver.

Reception and awards 
In 2001, Kuzma won the West Coast Music Award for "Best Independent Release" for her debut CD Contradictions. She received five nominations that same year, including Best Live Performer and Artist of the Year. Also in 2001, she was voted Canada's Best Independent Artist at canadian-music.com. Mister Marcus from the Bay Area Reporter called Kuzma "an absolute hit with the audience", and encouraged his readers to "keep an eye on this name!"

Discography 
Contradictions (1999)
It's Christmas (Without You), CD single (2001)
Who You Are (2005)
A Walk On the Clouds, CD single from the full-length CD entitled Les Allumeurs de Reves by Samuel Sixto featuring Kim Kuzma (2006)
Meant To Fly, Official Anthem of the 2007 Vancouver BG Triathlon World Cup (2007)
Guardian Angels, CD maxi-single (2008)
I Am Alive, EP (2010)
Acustico (2013)

Canadian singer-songwriters
Musicians from Vancouver
Living people
Kuzma, Kim
Year of birth missing (living people)